Liburnascincus artemis is an endemic species that inhabits Queensland, Australia.

References

Liburnascincus
Skinks of Australia
Endemic fauna of Australia
Reptiles described in 2015
Taxa named by Conrad J. Hoskin
Taxa named by Patrick J. Couper